Fry is a commune in the Seine-Maritime department in the Normandy region in northern France.

Geography

Population

Places of interest
 The thirteenth century church of St.Martin.
 A presbytery dating from the seventeenth century.

See also
Communes of the Seine-Maritime department

References

External links

Fry on the Quid website 

Communes of Seine-Maritime